is a Japanese long jumper. He is the 2003 World Youth Champion in the event.

He is currently the director of the track and field club at the International Pacific University.

Personal bests

International competitions

References

External links

1986 births
Living people
Japanese male long jumpers
Sportspeople from Sapporo
Competitors at the 2007 Summer Universiade
University of Tsukuba alumni
Japanese athletics coaches